Bangladesh–Iran relations are the bilateral relations between Bangladesh and Iran. Despite not having any major deals or any big kind of trade, the representatives of both nations have called for expanding economic relations between the two countries. Both are members of the OIC and the Developing 8.

History
Many Iranians migrated to Bengal throughout history in search of employment as well as to propagate Islam. Baba Kotwal Isfahani was among the first recorded Iranians to migrate from the Khwarazmian Empire to Bengal in 1204, arriving as an acquaintance of the Turco-Persian military ruler Bakhtiyar Khalji during his conquest of the region.

The Bengal Sultanate was a stronghold for Iranian immigrants. With Persian as an official language, Bengal witnessed an influx of Persian scholars, lawyers, teachers and clerics. During the reign of Ghiyasuddin Azam Shah, Sonargaon became an important centre of Persian literature, with many publications of prose and poetry. Described as the "golden age of Persian literature in Bengal", its stature is illustrated by the Sultan's correspondence with Persian poet Hafez. When the Sultan invited Hafez to complete an incomplete ghazal by the ruler, the poet responded by acknowledging the grandeur of the Sultan's court and the literary quality of Bengali-Persian poetry.

Emperor Shah Rukh of Persia had diplomatic relations with the Sultan of Bengal Jalaluddin Muhammad Shah. Emperor Shah Rukh contributed to ending the 5-year long Bengal Sultanate–Jaunpur Sultanate War after pressuring the Sultan of Jaunpur Ibrahim Sharqi to abstain from attacking Bengal "or to take the consequence upon himself. To which the intimation of the Jaunpur ruler was obedient, and desisted from his attacks upon Bengal".

Liberation War
Iran was concerned with the imminent break-up of Pakistan which, it feared, would have caused the state to fractionalise into small pieces, ultimately resulting in Iran's encirclement by rivals. In December 1971, President Nixon of the United States encouraged Iran to send military supplies to Pakistan. After many of the PAF jets being defeated, the PAF aircraft that survived decided to take refuge at Iranian air bases, refusing to continue fighting.

Modern relations 
With the fall of the Shah in 1979, new dimensions were added to the relationship between the newly proclaimed Islamic Republic of Iran and Bangladesh. Relations gradually grew further with President Hashemi Rafsanjani becoming the first Iranian leader to visit independent Bangladesh in 1995. Subsequently, Bangladeshi Prime Minister Sheikh Hasina also visited Iran and held talks with President Mohammed Khatami. Iran assisted Bangladesh with relief package after the cyclone Sidr hit Bangladesh in 2007.

The government of President Mahmoud Ahmadinejad sought to deepen ties between the two states, with Iranian investment in Bangladeshi industry. Bangladesh has also supported Iran's nuclear program, saying it is for peaceful purposes.

Bangladesh and Iran signed a preferential trade accord in July 2006 which removed non-tariff barriers, with a view to eventually establishing a free trade agreement. Before the signing of the accord, bilateral trade between the countries amounted to US$100 million annually.

In mid-2007, the Bangladeshi government requested Iran's help in the construction of a nuclear power plant in Bangladesh, in order to offset the decline in the availability of gas for power generation. Bangladeshi Minister of Power, Energy and Natural Resources also requested Iranian assistance for the construction of new oil refineries in Bangladesh.

Trade relations
Bangladesh and Iran signed an MoU on signing a bilateral trade agreement at the meeting held on 20 February 2001.
Besides, there is a preferential trade agreement signed in 2006 between the two countries which has remained not functional for last nine years.

The proposed joint council deal is expected to increase Bangladesh's export to Iran as the latter has good demand of jute and jute goods.

“Bangladesh government also plans to provide some trade facilities to exporters to Iran. The issue will be discussed with the Iranian authorities,” said an official.
Of the MoUs, an MoU will be signed on the import of wheat from Iran, officials said. An MoU on agriculture sector signed at the 2013 meeting will be extended till 2020.

About the PTA, officials said the countries have failed to settle dispute of rules of origin of products in last nine years of signing of the agreement, which has kept it non-functional.

Meanwhile, Iran asked Bangladesh to regularly pay installments of a loan taken from the country in the 1980s.

An ERD letter sent to foreign affairs ministry recently cited the development.

Bangladesh took the loan to construct Ashuganj Fertiliser and Chemical Company Ltd, but later faced problems in continuing the repayment of installments after the sanction was imposed on Iran in 2006.

Terrorism
Bangladesh and Iran have discussed possible cooperation in the area of fighting against extremism.
“We discussed the possibility of common joint cooperation on extremism and we will look into the exact details of how we can do that,” visiting Iranian Foreign Minister Javed Zarif said at a press briefing at Hotel Sonargaon yesterday.

He came to Dhaka Tuesday night to explain the nuclear solution it had with the Western World. He left the city yesterday.

He had official talks with his Bangladesh counterpart AH Mahmood Ali and courtesy call on President Abdul Hamid and Prime Minister Sheikh Hasina.

Oil development 
Eastern Refinery, the sole oil refinery in Bangladesh, was built with assistance from Iran.

References

Further reading 
 Chapter on PERSIAN IN BENGAL in "The Rise, Growth And Decline of Indo-Persian Literature" by R. M. Chopra, Iran Culture House. New Delhi, 2012. Also revised edition published in 2013.

External links 
 Iran and Bangladesh, International Humanist and Ethical Union
 

 

 
Bilateral relations of Iran
Iran